The General Federation of Free Employees (AfA-Bund) was an amalgamation of various socialist-oriented trade unions of technical and administrative employees in the Weimar Republic.

Member organizations encompassed groups as diverse as artists, theater workers, bank clerks, foremen, and technical employees and managers.  It was founded in 1920 and was dissolved in on March 30, 1933, just before the newly empowered Nazi regime began crushing the Free Trade Unions.  Throughout its existence, it was led by Siegfried Aufhäuser.

Affiliates
The following unions were affiliated to the federation:

Central Union of Employees (ZdA)
German Workers' Union (DWV)
Union of Technical Staff and Officials (Butab)
Polishing, Works and Shaft Masters' Unions
General Association of German Bank Employees
Co-operative of German Stage Members
International Artists' Lodge (IAL)
Union of German Ship Engineers
Master Craftsmen's Association of the Shoe Industry
German Choir and Dancers' Union
German Union of Carriers
Union of cutters, directors
Union of German Captains and Helmsmen of Merchant Shipping and Deep Sea Fishing
AfA Association of Polish Upper Silesia

References

External links 
 List of PDF articles related to the Allgemeiner Freier Angestelltenbund Friedrich Ebert Foundation. Retrieved December 12, 2011 

Organizations based in the Weimar Republic
Trade unions disestablished in 1933
Trade unions established in 1920
1920 establishments in Germany
Defunct trade unions of Germany